The Nordic Institute of Stage and Studio is a private college located in Oslo, Norway. It focuses on subjects related to stage, studio, film and television, and is one of the largest educational centers in the Nordic countries with this specific theme.

Founded as Norsk Lydskole (Norwegian School of Sound) in 1985, the school has since expanded to include several courses related to performing arts. The course Popular Music has an option of entering year three of a bachelor's degree at the University of Wolverhampton,  studying BA Popular Music or BA Music Technology & Popular Music.

Since 2007 it has been owned by the investment company Anthon B Nilsen.

In 2014, Westerdals Oslo School of Arts, Communication and Technology was established as a result of the merger of the three colleges Westerdals School of Communication, NISS (Nordic Institute of Stage and Studio) and NITH (The Norwegian School of Information Technology).

References

External links
Official website
A brief description of NISS in English

Universities and colleges in Norway
Education in Oslo
Educational institutions established in 1985
1985 establishments in Norway
Stagecraft